The Doll is a 1968 Polish film directed by Wojciech Jerzy Has. 

The film is an adaptation of the novel The Doll by Bolesław Prus, which is regarded by many as one of the finest Polish novels ever written. The influence of Émile Zola is evident, and some have compared the novel to Madame Bovary by Gustave Flaubert; both were Prus's contemporaries. The movie, however, may be more compared to Stendhal's The Red and the Black.

The Doll constitutes a panorama of life in Warsaw between 1878 and 1879, and at the same time is a subtle story of three generations of Polish idealists, their psychological complications, their involvement in the history of the nineteenth century, social dramas, moral problems and the experience of tragic existence. At the same time this story describes the disintegration of social relationships and the growing separation of a society whose aristocratic elite spreads the models of vanity and idleness. In the bad air of a backward country, anti-Semitic ideas are born, valuable individuals meet obstacles on their way, and scoundrels are successful. 

This poetic love story follows a nouveau riche merchant, Stanislaw Wokulski, through a series of trials and tribulations occasioned by his obsessive passion for an aristocratic beauty, Izabela Lecka (played by Beata Tyszkiewicz).

Plot
As a descendant of an impoverished Polish noble family, young Wokulski is forced to work as a waiter at Hopfer's, a Warsaw restaurant, while dreaming of a life in science. After taking part in the failed 1863 Uprising against Tsarist Russia, he is sentenced to exile in Siberia. On eventual return to Warsaw, he becomes a salesman at Mincel's haberdashery. Marrying the late owner's widow (who eventually dies), he comes into money and uses it to set up a partnership with a Russian merchant he had met while in exile. The two merchants go to Bulgaria during the Russo-Turkish War, and Wokulski makes a fortune supplying the Russian Army. The enterprising Wokulski now proves a romantic at heart, falling in love with Izabela, daughter of the vacuous, bankrupt aristocrat, Tomasz Łęcki. In his quest to win Izabela, Wokulski begins frequenting theatres and aristocratic salons; and to help her financially distressed father, founds a company and sets the aristocrats up as shareholders in his business. The indolence of these aristocrats, who secure with their pensions, are too lazy to undertake new business risks, frustrates Wokulski. His ability to make money is respected but his lack of family and social rank is condescended to. Because of his "help" (in secret) to Izabela's impecunious but influential father, the girl becomes aware of his affection. In the end she consents to accept him, but without true devotion or love.

Cast 
 Mariusz Dmochowski - Stanislaw Wokulski
 Beata Tyszkiewicz - Izabela Lecka
 Tadeusz Fijewski - Ignacy Rzecki
  - Zaslawska
 Wiesław Gołas - Krzeszowski
 Kalina Jędrusik - Wasowska
 Jan Koecher - Prince
 Jan Kreczmar - Tomasz Lecki
 Tadeusz Kondrat - Szlangbaum
 Halina Kwiatkowska - Krzeszowska
 Andrzej Łapicki - Kazimierz Starski
 Jan Machulski - Julian Ochocki
 Józef Pieracki - Doctor Szuman
  - Countess Joanna

References

External links

1968 films
Films directed by Wojciech Has
Films scored by Wojciech Kilar
Films based on Polish novels
Films set in Bulgaria
Films set in Warsaw
Films set in the 1870s
Films set in the Russian Empire
1960s Polish-language films
Polish romantic drama films